The Landskroon was a ship of the Dutch East India Company (VOC) which traded with Japan in the mid-18th century.

References

External links 
 

1764 ships
Age of Sail merchant ships of the Dutch Republic
Individual sailing vessels
Ships of the Dutch East India Company